Anolis saxatilis, the pallid stout anole or Whiteman's anole, is a species of lizard in the family Dactyloidae. The species is found in Hispaniola.

References

Anoles
Reptiles described in 1938
Reptiles of Haiti
Reptiles of the Dominican Republic
Taxa named by Robert Mertens